The location known as Krępina  (German: Krempine) is a settlement in the administrative district of Gmina Sława, within Wschowa County, Lubusz Voivodeship, in western Poland.

Before World War II the village was part of Germany and renamed Neuacker in 1936.

References

Villages in Wschowa County